Mr. Brown Coffee is a series of canned coffee products produced by King Car Group of Taiwan.  It was launched in 1982.
Mr. Brown Coffee is sold in 240ml steel cans and 330ml plastic bottles.  Varieties include original, espresso, cappuccino, vanilla, Colombian, Macadamia nut, Black and Blue Mountain Style.

As part of the 2008 Chinese milk scandal, it was discovered that the same melamine-contaminated milk was being used for Mr. Brown instant coffee mixes.
The company then switched to New Zealand-sourced milk for their products.

In 2019, to celebrate Brunei's 35th National Day, Mr. Brown released specially-designed cans featuring Bruneian landmarks such as the Raja Isteri Pegiran Anak Saleha Bridg and Sultan Omar Ali Saifuddien III Mosque. In 2021, Mr. Brown also designed cans featuring Bruneinean front-liners with a message of "Together We Can Achieve The Target" which implies Brunei's full vaccinations target of 80% by the end of 2021.
In 2022, to also celebrate Brunei's 38th National Day, Mr. Brown designed cans featuring a message that says "Proud to be Orang Brunei".

As of January 2019, Mr. Brown Cafe operated 38 locations around Taiwan.

References

External links 
 Official site (Chinese)
 Official site (German)
 Review
 Sunny Maid Corp. Distributors of Mr. Brown Coffee in the USA
 Everlasting Distributors Exclusive distributors of Mr. Brown Coffee in the USA

Coffee brands
Taiwanese drinks
Taiwanese brands
1982 establishments in Taiwan
Products introduced in 1982
King Car Group